Hi De Ho (also known as Hi-De-Ho) is a 1947 American musical race film directed by Josh Binney. Distributed by All American Entertainment, the film stars an all African American cast, led by Cab Calloway. It first showed at the Squire Theatre in New York, and would be shown in the more than 500 African-American theaters in the US.

Plot
Cab Calloway, an up and coming jazz musician is putting together a band, he was looking forward to making it big as the bandleader. His girlfriend Minnie, was upset that Cab has retained the services of a female band manager to help him promote his band and get his first big break. His band manager gets him a chance to audition his jazz octet before the local owner of the new club, which he then signs the big band for its opening. Minnie becomes suspicious and jealous that Nettie, as Cab's new female band manager, is doing good things for Cab and is winning points with him.

When Cab auditions with his octet, the new club owner is impressed, but he said that he needs his band for his club opening to become more successful. He gets the job when he says that he can easily recruit more band members, and he opens for the new club for its opening at the end of the week.

When he and his band make their success, Minnie gets intensely jealous and goes to a local "fix-it" man Boss Mason, who uses gun man Mo the Mouse as his 'assistant'. Minnie starts to play both sides of the fence in wanting to be his girlfriend, while also trying to keep Cab in place so that his relations with Nettie have "no chance to blossom". When Boss Mason gets too close to Cab, Cab must defend himself against Mo the Mouse before the bullets fly.

Cast
Cab Calloway as himself
Cab Calloway Orchestra with Elton Hill as themselves
Ida James as Nettie
Jeni Le Gon as Minnie
William Campbell as Sparks
George Wiltshire as Boss Mason
James Dunmore as Mo the Mouse
Leonard Rogers as Ralph

Music
 "Minnie Was a Hepcat" (a capella) (Calloway and His Orchestra)
 "St. James Infirmary" (Calloway and His Orchestra)
 "At Dawn Time" (Calloway and His Orchestra)
 "Hey Now" (Calloway and His Orchestra)
 "The Hi De Ho Man" (Calloway and His Orchestra)
 "I Got a Gal Named Nellie" (Calloway and Elton Hill)
 "Open the Door, Richard!" (Dusty Fletcher)
 "Little Old Lady from Baltimore" (The Peters Sisters)
 "A Rainy Sunday" (The Peters Sisters)

Orchestra members include Jonah Jones, trombonist Quentin Jackson, tenor saxophonist Sam "The Man" Taylor, pianist Dave Rivera, Milt Hinton and drummer Panama Francis.

The film also features tap dancers Miller Brothers and Lois doing their routine on built up blocks and stands.

Critical reception
Variety noted, "Calloway fans will find Hi De Ho right up their alley .... Story is just one of
those things ... (it) is primarily an excuse for spotlighting some okay vaude acts on celluloid but the audience it's aimed at will overlook the technical deficiencies." Calloway was natural enough and Ida James and Jeni Le Gon did the best they could with the slim script.

Further reading

References

External links

 
 

1947 films
American black-and-white films
1947 musical films
Race films
Articles containing video clips
American musical films
1940s English-language films
1940s American films